Reola is a village in Hilauli block of Unnao district, Uttar Pradesh, India. As of 2011, its population is 594, in 105 households, and it has no schools and no healthcare facilities.

The 1961 census recorded Reola (here spelled "Reula") as comprising 3 hamlets, with a total population of 187 (101 male and 86 female), in 30 households and 30 physical houses. The area of the village was given as 121 acres.

References

Villages in Unnao district